Liam Blockley, also known by the nickname of "Blockers", is a professional rugby league footballer who most recently played for the Featherstone Rovers in the Kingstone Press Championship. He plays as a centre or second row.

References

External links
Cas Tigers profile

Living people
English rugby league players
Rugby league second-rows
Rugby league centres
Featherstone Rovers players
Rugby league players from Yorkshire
Year of birth missing (living people)